Reviens is the second studio album recorded by the Canadian singer Garou, and his third album overall. Released in May 2003, this album was a great success in many countries, including France, Belgium, Switzerland and Poland where it reached the top five.

In May 2004 Reviens was reissued with bonus track "La Rivière de notre enfance".

Track listing

Original release
"Passe ta route" (Jacques Veneruso)  — 2:56
"Et si on dormait" (Gérald De Palmas)  — 3:40
"Hemingway" (Didier Barbelivien)  — 4:16
"L'aveu" (Sophie Nault, Claude Pineault)  — 3:52
"Reviens (Où te caches-tu?)" (Jacques Veneruso)  — 3:12
"Pour l'amour d'une femme" (Luc Plamondon, Aldo Nova, Ago Jeremy-Michael De Paul)  — 3:59
"Pendant que mes cheveux poussent" (Erick Benzi)  — 2:17
"Les filles" (Jean-Jacques Goldman)  — 3:08
"Le sucre et le sel" (Featuring Annie & Suzie Villeneuve) (Erick Benzi) — 3:54
"Quand passe la passion" (Romano Musumarra, Luc Plamondon)  — 3:55
"Au cœur de la terre" (Romano Musumarra, Luc Plamondon)  — 3:38
"Prière indienne" (Jacques Veneruso)  — 3:57
"Tout cet amour-là" (Jean-Jacques Goldman)  — 4:34
"Ne me parlez plus d'elle" (Eric Lapointe, Roger Tabra, Stéphane Dufour)  — 3:44
"Ton premier regard" (Gildas Arzel)  — 4:32
"Une dernière fois encore" (featuring Gildas Arzel) (Gildas Arzel) — 6:22

Reissue
"Passe ta route" (Jacques Veneruso)  — 2:56
"Et si on dormait" (Gérald De Palmas)  — 3:40
"Hemingway" (Didier Barbelivien)  — 4:16
"L'aveu" (Sophie Nault, Claude Pineault)  — 3:52
"Reviens (Où te caches-tu?)" (Jacques Veneruso)  — 3:12
"Pour l'amour d'une femme" (Luc Plamondon, Aldo Nova, Ago Jeremy-Michael De Paul)  — 3:59
"Pendant que mes cheveux poussent" (Erick Benzi)  — 2:17
"Les filles" (Jean-Jacques Goldman)  — 3:08
"Le sucre et le sel" (Featuring Annie & Suzie Villeneuve) (Erick Benzi) — 3:54
"Quand passe la passion" (Romano Musumarra, Luc Plamondon)  — 3:55
"Au cœur de la terre" (Romano Musumarra, Luc Plamondon)  — 3:38
"Prière indienne" (Jacques Veneruso)  — 3:57
"Tout cet amour-là" (Jean-Jacques Goldman)  — 4:34
"Ne me parlez plus d'elle" (Eric Lapointe, Roger Tabra, Stéphane Dufour)  — 3:44
"Ton premier regard" (Gildas Arzel)  — 4:32
"Une dernière fois encore" (Featuring Gildas Arzel) (Gildas Arzel) — 6:22
"La Rivière de notre enfance" (Duo avec Michel Sardou)

Certifications

Charts

References

2003 albums
Garou (singer) albums
Albums produced by Aldo Nova
Columbia Records albums
Sony Music Canada albums
Albums produced by Erick Benzi